General elections to the Cortes Generales were held in Spain in 1822. At stake were all 203 seats in the Congress of Deputies.

History 
The 1822 elections were the second ones since the 1820 revolution. The elections were held under the Spanish Constitution of 1812. 3,215,460 people were eligible to vote (universal male suffrage), out of a population of 11,661,865.

Constituencies 
A majority voting system was used for the election, with 33 multi-member constituencies and various single-member ones.

Results 

Almost all MPs were liberals, mainly from the radical veinteañista or exaltada faction.

References 

 Estadísticas históricas de España: siglos XIX-XX.

Elections in Spain
1822 in Spain
1822
October 1822 events
Spain
December 1822 events